National Defence College (NDC), formerly known as the National War College (NWC), is an apex military training institution of Nigeria for senior military officer of the Nigeria Armed Forces.

Establishment 
The institution was established in 1992 as the highest military training institution for senior officers of the Nigerian Armed Force and also considered as an center of Excellence for peace support operations training in a strategic level for West Africa regions, the NDC was formerly known as the National War College when it was established.

Apart from the long strong tri-service military training heritage of the Nigerian Armed Forces with the foundation of Armed Forces Command and Staff College, Jaji and Nigerian Defence Academy as a middle level staff training college, this was the appropriate effective cost to traditionally established a tri-service basis for a new strategic level military institution.

History and background 
NDC firstly started it operating in a temporary place at the former Ministry of Foreign Affairs site in Lagos before relocating to Abuja in 1995 also as a temporary site at the adjacent Herbert Macaulay Way in Abuja, it permanently moved to the main site in September 1998 at the Piwoyi street along the Nnamdi Azikwe International Airport road, Jabi District Abuja by Sani Abacha after inaugurating the Nigeria War College course 4.

The institution direction of its affairs is presided by the Board of Governor comprises; the Minister of Defence, Commandant NDC, Chief of Defence Staff, Chief of Air Staff, Chief of Army Staff, Chief of Naval Staff and the Permanent Secretary of the Ministry of Defence.

Philosophy 
NDC provides the highest level of professional training programmes, formal military experience and education as advanced sense of military professionalism together with the process of making decision through structures of democratic political culture, giving the development policy option of when, where and how to applied the application of force for security and peaceful existences.

Mission 
The mission of the institution is to impart knowledge and development of expertise and skills for selected senior officer and civilian ones through a firm understanding for the factors which implies the impact of the nations security and prepare them in higher responsibilities at strategic and operational level both in international assignment.

The NDC and it fellows intention is to play a part in evolution of military thoughts meeting the new circumstances of the 21st century. The NDC mission and philosophy is pursued through seminars, conference, lectures, syndicate assignments and workshops.

Partners 
The (NDC) and the Peace Operations Training Institute had partners together for available e-learning on the peacekeeping courses, it offers downloadable course materials for offline studies for the personnel of National Defence College. The subject includes; French, English, Arabic and Spanish, the minimum of 75% pass in examination received the Certificate of Completion.

In cooperation of the Ministry of Defence and Ministry of Foreign Affairs of Nigeria, the National Defence College had been actively participating in the peace support operations training and any related activities since its began operation. The Centre for Strategic Research and Studies is responsibility in coordinating peacekeeping training in Nigeria, In dedication to the senior military and paramilitary officers preparation and it civilian counterpart in the various related ministries and agencies like the Ministry of Finance: responsible for the Nigerian Customs Service and other officers from other countries for a higher strategic, responsibilities level including some department of the Federal Government. In 2004, NDC under the supervision of the Nigerian Ministry of Foreign Affairs, Ministry of Defence, and Armed Forces Joint Staff hosted a Challenges seminar of Regional Dimensions of Peace Operations. Its had co-chaired the authority of the working group in command and control for the reports on Designing Mandates and Capabilities of future peace operations.

It runs high and mid level strategic courses such as the; Peace Support Operations Planning Course, Senior Mission Leaders Course, Defence and Security Management Course, and Civil-military Relations through it Centre for Strategic Research and Studies. The NDC also conducts various research on the critical issues bordering on security and governance.

Bibliography 

 African Armed Forces and the Challenges of Defence Budgeting Issue 6 of Inauguration lecture series Issue 6 of National defence college Nigeria inauguration lecture series, 	G. J. Jonah, African Centre for Strategic Research and Studies, National Defence College Nigeria, 2008 Original from	the University of California
 Developing Positive Attitude Issue 7 of Inauguration lecture series Author	Thomas Jonah Lokoson, 	National Defence College Nigeria. African Centre for Strategic Research and Studies Publisher	African Centre for Strategic Research and Studies (Africa Peace Review) Africa Peace Review National Defence College Nigeria, 2010.

Notes

External links

Citations 

 CISM Media and Communication Department

References 
 
 

Defence agencies of Nigeria
Military education and training in Nigeria
Educational institutions established in 1992
1992 establishments in Nigeria
Universities and colleges in Nigeria